The Grand Ballon or Great Belchen is the highest mountain of the Vosges, located  northwest of Mulhouse, France. It is also the highest point of the Grand-Est French region.

Name 

Grand Ballon means "great [round-topped] mountain" because a ballon in French is a geographical term for a mountain with a rounded summit, similar to the German Kuppe. 

Climate 

According to the Köppen climate classification, the top of the Grand Ballon features a subalpine climate (Köppen: Dfc) due to its high latitude compare to the Alps or the Pyrenees. Along with the Hohneck the summit of the Grand Ballon is the coldest and windiest point in Alsace. The highest snow accumulation ever recorded was  7 March 2006; in 1969 and 1970 the snow cover was above .

Trails 

Tour de France
The road over the pass to the north of the mountain is occasionally used in the Tour de France, the first crossing being in 1969. It is the only Hors categorie (beyond categorization) climb in northern France.

Belchen System 
The mountain is part of the so-called Belchen System, a group of mountains with the name "Belchen" (in German) that may have been part of a Celtic sun calendar.

World War I Monument 
Near the radar station or air traffic control centre, there are two First World War (1914-1918) memorials called, Memorial Diables Bleus Grand Ballon, commemorating the French troops, in particular the Chasseurs Alpins, whose nickname is Les Diables Bleus (Eng: The Blue Devils), who fought there in World War I. The original single monument was erected in 1927 but was dynamited, by German troops, in July 1940 during World War II and rebuilt in 1960.

Gallery

See also
Ballon d'Alsace

References

External links

Profile of climb from Willer-sur-Thur.
 Le Grand Ballon dans le Tour de France  
Cycling up to Le Grand Ballon: data, profile, map, photos and description  

Mountains of the Vosges
One-thousanders of France
Mountains of Haut-Rhin